Bertrand Roland Roberge (born October 3, 1954) is an American former professional baseball pitcher. He played in Major League Baseball for the Houston Astros, Chicago White Sox, and Montreal Expos from 1979 through 1986.

Amateur career
A native of Lewiston, Maine, Roberge attended the University of Maine, where he played college baseball for the Maine Black Bears baseball team from 1974 to 1977.  He set the school career ERA record at Maine, at 1.82. In 1975, he played collegiate summer baseball in the Cape Cod Baseball League for the Yarmouth-Dennis Red Sox. He was selected by the Astros in the 17th round of the 1976 MLB Draft.

Professional career
In his 1979 rookie season with the Houston Astros, he appeared in 26 games, posting a 3-0 record with a 1.69 ERA. He split the following four seasons between the Astros and Triple-A Tucson. Prior to the 1984 season, he signed with the White Sox as a free agent, and appeared in 21 games for Chicago that year. After the season, the White Sox traded Roberge to the Montreal Expos, where he spent his final two big league seasons.

In 219.1 innings pitched in 146 appearances, Roberge handled 56 total chances (20 putouts, 36 assists) without an error in his MLB career for a perfect 1.000 fielding percentage.

After baseball
Roberge currently works in sales for Northeast Growers.  He is a resident of Auburn, Maine.

References

Sources

1954 births
Living people
American expatriate baseball players in Canada
Baseball players from Maine
Chicago White Sox players
Cocoa Astros players
Covington Astros players
Denver Zephyrs players
Houston Astros players
Indianapolis Indians players
Major League Baseball pitchers
Maine Black Bears baseball players
Memphis Blues players
Montreal Expos players
Sportspeople from Lewiston, Maine
Tucson Toros players
West Palm Beach Expos players
Yarmouth–Dennis Red Sox players